The Vigna Randanini are Jewish Catacombs between the second and third miles of the Appian Way close to the Christian catacombs of Saint Sebastian, with which they were originally confused. The catacombs date between the 2nd and 5th-centuries CE, and take their name from the owners of the land when they were first formally discovered and from the fact that the land was used as a vineyard (vigna). While Vigna Randanini are just one of the two Jewish catacombs in Rome open to the public, they can only be visited by appointment. They are situated below a restaurant and a private villa and entrance is from the Via Appia Pignatelli side. These catacombs were discovered by accident in 1859, although there is evidence that they had been pillaged before then. They cover an area of 18,000 square metres and the tunnels are around 700 metres long, of which around 400 can be seen.

The synagogue
The entrance reused a pagan building, to which was added a vaulted ceiling and a floor mosaic with black and white tiles. This is thought to have been intended to be used as a synagogue, a hypothesis supported by a well that received drain water from the external mosaic, the existence of two separate units (for men and women), the presence of apses and the mosaic, and the distance of the building from urban areas.

The catacombs

The catacombs, which are on two levels between 5 and 16.3 metres below the surface, were used between the 2nd and 4th centuries, with the maximum number of interments at the end of that period. Several thousand Jews were buried there. The Hypogeum consists of two main galleries, divided into several branches.  There are niches carved into stone walls, and cubicles with arcosolia. The tunnels also have “shaped” tombs excavated in the volcanic floor. There are several cubicula, or chapels, which would have been used by families. Many tombs follow the kokhim style, extending perpendicular to the wall of the gallery. Similar examples are found in Palestine and Israel. Some painted cubicles depict flower motifs and animals but also subjects typical of the Jewish faith such as the seven-branch candelabrum.  They have an irregular plan and, although joined together, are divided into separate areas. This suggests new land acquisitions and catacomb developments as more and more space was required.

The catacombs are unique for the extent of the decoration. Decorations include a winged Victory in position to crown a naked young man, various figures such as peacocks, birds and baskets of flowers, Pegasus, roosters, chickens, peacocks and other birds. Under a figure of Fortuna, there are a hippocampus and two dolphins. These decorations suggest to some researchers that the tunnels had previous pagan occupants and may have been reused by the Jews. Decorations of these and other Jewish catacombs in Rome provide identification of at least eleven ancient synagogues and important information on symbolism and the Jewish iconography, such as the menorah, the lulav, the shofar, and Torah scrolls. About 25-30% of the inscriptions are in Latin or Aramaic. The rest are in Greek, suggesting that language was the language of most use to a large part of the immigrant population.

See also
 Jewish Museum of Rome
 Beit She'arim (Roman-era Jewish village)
 Beit She'arim National Park

References

External links
 Map of the catacomb of Vigna Randanini

Catacombs of Rome
Ancient Roman tombs and cemeteries in Rome
Rome Q. IX Appio-Latino
Jewish catacombs